Who Killed Cock Robin is a Silly Symphonies short released on June 26, 1935, by United Artists, produced by Walt Disney and directed by David Hand. It is based on the nursery rhyme Who Killed Cock Robin?. It was nominated for the Best Short Subject (Cartoons) Oscar but lost to Disney’s own Three Orphan Kittens.

An extract from the cartoon was featured the following year in Alfred Hitchcock's Sabotage; the film's opening credits thank Disney for giving permission.

Plot
While Cock Robin is serenading Jenny Wren, an unseen archer shoots an arrow into Cock Robin's heart. Then he falls to the ground, giving the other birds in the tree an impression that he has been shot and killed. The police arrive at the scene and apprehend a cuckoo, a sparrow, and a blackbird as suspects.

The next day, a trial is held over the identity of Cock Robin's murderer, with an owl serving as the judge and a parrot serving as the prosecutor. They interrogate the suspects and show Cock Robin's body as evidence. The blackbird confesses that he hasn't done, seen, or known anything about it. The sparrow refuses to say anything. The cuckoo doesn't know either, but he continuously points to the judge, the prosecutor, and even himself, showing that he is indeed "cuckoo". Everybody is ashamed, because nobody knows who killed Cock Robin.

At that moment, Jenny Wren arrives and demands that she see justice be done for Cock Robin. Eventually, the judge declares that all three suspects shall be hung, because he doesn't know which one of them is guilty. Suddenly, another arrow strikes the judge's hat, and its owner is revealed to be Cupid. Cupid explains that although he shot Cock Robin, Robin isn't dead after all. He just simply fell for Jenny Wren and was currently unconscious from landing on his head, because the arrow that he was shot with was in his armpit. Jenny Wren revives Cock Robin, and they both kiss to the excitement of the jury.

Voice cast
 Jenny: Martha Wentworth
 Judge: Billy Bletcher
 Irish cop: Leo Cleary
 D.A. parrot: Don Brodie
 Blackbird: Nick Stewart
 Dan Cupid: Charlie Lung
 Whistling: Purv Pullen
 Cock Robin: Bill Roberts
 Misc. voices: Gary Mix, Jack Dale, Lou Debney, John Reed

Trivia
There are in the animated short references and tributes in form of caricatures to some Hollywood celebrities of that time. The Blackbird is based on Stepin Fetchit, the Sparrow on Edward G. Robinson, and the Cuckoo on Harpo Marx, while Cock Robin and Jenny Wren are respectively based on Bing Crosby and Mae West. Dan Cupid is based on Joe Penner.

Home media
The short was released on December 4, 2001, on Walt Disney Treasures: Silly Symphonies - The Historic Musical Animated Classics, as an Easter egg found in the "Favorite Characters" section.

References

External links 
 

1935 films
1935 short films
1930s Disney animated short films
Silly Symphonies
1935 animated films
Films based on nursery rhymes
Films directed by David Hand
Films produced by Walt Disney
Animation based on real people
Cultural depictions of Bing Crosby
Cultural depictions of Mae West
Cultural depictions of the Marx Brothers
Films scored by Frank Churchill
1930s American films